The 1963 Lehigh Engineers football team was an American football team that represented Lehigh University during the 1963 NCAA College Division football season. Lehigh finished second-to-last in both the Middle Atlantic Conference, University Division, and the Middle Three Conference.

In their second year under head coach Mike Cooley, the Engineers compiled a 1–8 record. Jake LaMotta was the team captain.

In conference play, Lehigh's 1–3 record against opponents in the MAC University Division represented the fifth-best winning percentage in the six-team circuit, half a game ahead of Lafayette's 1–4. The Engineers went 1–1 against the Middle Three, losing to Rutgers and beating Lafayette.

The season-ending rivalry game against Lafayette was originally slated for November 23, but postponed following the assassination of John F. Kennedy the previous day. The November 30 makeup date was the latest in the year that the 99-year traditional matchup had ever been held.

Lehigh played its home games at Taylor Stadium on the university campus in Bethlehem, Pennsylvania.

Schedule

References

Lehigh
Lehigh
Lehigh Mountain Hawks football seasons
Lehigh Engineers football